House Party 4: Down to the Last Minute is a 2001 American direct-to-video comedy film. It is the standalone fourth installment in the House Party film series as it has no connection to any of the preceding films or the subsequent film House Party: Tonight's the Night. It stars IMx, and is the only film in the series to not star Kid 'n Play. This is IMx's second House Party film; they also appeared in House Party 3 when they were known as Immature and portrayed entirely different characters than they do in this film.

Plot
Jon-Jon sees a ripe opportunity for a major party when he snags the job house-sitting for his rich Uncle Charles. The mansion comes with a platinum colored Mercedes-Benz 430 and, although Uncle Charles has told him not to drive the car or have people over, Jon-Jon wastes no time in doing both; Jon-Jon is not only having an "entertainment party", but he's auditioning his hip-hop band (IMx) for a record executive. When Jon-Jon finds out his uncle is coming home earlier than announced, he has to race against time to try to put everything back the way he found it.

Cast

 Marques "Batman" Houston as Jon "Jon-Jon" Harris, Jr.
 Jerome "Romeo" Jones as Mark
 Kelton "LDB" Kessee as T
 Alexis Fields as Monique Harris
 Meagan Good as Tina Johnson
 Kym Whitley as Judy Lester Harris
 Buddy Lewis as Charles Lester
 Mari Morrow as Linda Lester
 Dorien Wilson as Jon Harris, Sr.
 Irene Stokes as Mable Lester
 Henrietta Komras as Mrs. Tupay
 Chris Stokes as Ray-Ray
 Jamal Mixon as Heidi
 Jerod Mixon as Bertha
 Nick Testa as Nightbeast

Sequel
At the end of the film, Jon Jon and Monique hint at a sequel centering on Monique as the protagonist. That film, however, was never produced. The next film in the series, House Party: Tonight's the Night starring Tequan Richmond and Zac Goodspeed, was released direct to DVD on July 23, 2013; that film is a direct continuation of House Party 3, and disregards the events of House Party 4. Kid 'n Play, the franchise's original leads, make an appearance at the end of the film, reprising their roles from the first three films. It is revealed that the two have gone on to be successful music producers just as they aspired to in the second and third films.

References

External links
 
 

2001 films
2000s musical comedy films
2000s teen comedy films
African-American musical comedy films
American teen comedy films
Direct-to-video comedy films
Direct-to-video sequel films
House Party films
New Line Cinema direct-to-video films
2001 directorial debut films
2001 comedy films
2000s English-language films
2000s American films